Khuri Bari is a village in Laxmangarh Tehsil, Sikar district in the Indian state of Rajasthan. As of 2011 Khuri Bari had a population of 2194 residents.

Transport 
The village is located to the west of National Highway 52, between Sikar–Laxmangarh. Khuri Chhoti is on the west of the NH-52 road between Sikar–Laxmangarh and Khuri Bari is on the east of the NH-11.

Education 
The two centers of higher education nearby are Balaji College Ganeri and the Horizon Computer Education Institute & Technology Center.

External links 
Geo Location of Lachhmangarh
Geo Location of Khuri Bari

References

Villages in Sikar district